Shenjere Village is an inhabited place located in Gutu, Zimbabwe. Its chief is Makore, and its headman is Mr. Hilary Shenjere, the man who left Zimbabwe going overseas in 2003, currently living in the United States.  There is a primary school, "Shenjere Primary School" for 1st to 7th graders in this village. Some of the students have to walk 3 to 4 miles to reach school. There is no secondary school in this village, so children have to walk to other villages for secondary schools.

Gutu District
Populated places in Masvingo Province